Hump Mountain is a summit in West Virginia, in the United States.

Hump Mountain was so named on account of its outline being in the form of a hump.

References

Mountains of Summers County, West Virginia
Mountains of West Virginia